, better known by the stage name , is a Japanese actress, voice actress and singer from Setagaya, Tokyo. Kawamura is a freelancer and a former affiliate of Arts Vision. In 1991, she married manga artist Mamoru Nagano.

Filmography

Television animation
1980s
 Aura Battler Dunbine (1983) (Cham Fau)
 Mobile Suit Zeta Gundam (1985) (Beltorchika Irma)
 Tales of Little Women (1987) (Sally Gardiner)
 Peter Pan no Bōken (1989) (Tiger Lily, Luna)
1990s
 Robin Hood no Daiboken (1990) (Winifred Scarlet)
 Kyatto Ninden Teyandee (1990) (Tokugawa Usako)
 Trapp Family Story (1991) (Hedvic von Trapp)
 Sailor Moon S (1994) (Eudial)
 Romeo no Aoi Sora (1995) (Angeletta)
 Juuni Senshi Bakuretsu Eto Ranger (1995) (Tart, Princess Aura)
 Neon Genesis Evangelion (1996) (Kyōko Zeppelin Soryu)
 Revolutionary Girl Utena (1997) (Mamiya Chida, Shadow Girl A)
 Brain Powerd (1998) (Higgins Saz)
 Excel Saga (1999) (Kyoko)
 Pokémon (1999) (Kanna)
2000s
 Ghost Stories  (2000) (Kuchisake-onna) (scrapped episode)
 Tokyo Mew Mew (2002) (Rei Nishina)
 Pokémon Advanced Generation (2006) (Yuma)
 xxxHolic (2006) (Hanahana)
 Pokémon Diamond and Pearl (2007) (Momi)
 Darker than Black (2007) (Shizuka Isozaki)
 Rosario + Vampire Capu2 (2008) (Lilith)
2010s
 Humanity Has Declined (2012) (Narrator)
 Red Data Girl (2013) (Shizue Sōda)

Unknown date
 Anpanman (Princess Mizūmi, Kun Fūrin, Shanpū-chan, Chinkuru, Kami Fūsen Ponpon)
 City Hunter 2 (Yuriko)
 Gall Force (Eluza)
 Ghost Sweeper Mikami (Terusa, Mermaid of Namiko)
 Gunbuster (Jung Freud)
 Heavy Metal L-Gaim (Lillith Fuau, Gaw Ha Leccee)

 Kyūkyoku Chōjin R (Mari Saionji)
 Mamotte! Lollipop (Sarasa)
 Māru-ōkoku no Ningyō-hime 2 (Kururu)
 NG Knight Lamune & 40 (Toshiō, Reiyū)
 Osomatsu-kun (1988 series) (Kumiko)
 Other Life: Azure Dreams (Cherrl Child)
 PoPoLoCrois (Queen Narushia)
 Rockman DASH 2 - Episode 2: Great Inheritance (Matilda Caskett & Yuuna)
 Saber Marionette J (Tamasaburō)
 Saint Seiya (Freya)
 Slayers (Naga the Serpent/Nama)
 Super Robot Wars UX (Cham Fau)
 Tonde Burin (Nanako Tateishi)
 Uta Kata (Saya Kogure)
 Valkyrie Profile (Frei (known as "Freya" in U.S. release))
 Valkyrie Profile 2: Silmeria (Frei)
 Valkyrie Profile: Lenneth (Frei)
 Watashi no Ashinaga Ojisan (Karen Patterson)
 Yu Yu Hakusho (Hina)

Original video animation (OVA)
 Cleopatra DC (1989) (Cleopatra Corns)
 Yagami-kun's Family Affairs (1990) (Mayuki Ikari)
 Ayane's High Kick (1997) (Sakurako Miyagawa)
 El-Hazard (1997) (Ifurita)
 Mobile Suit Gundam Unicorn (2010) (Beltorchika Irma)

Theatrical animation
 Mobile Suit Gundam: Char's Counterattack (1988) (Quess Paraya)
 Gothicmade (2012) (Berin)
 Mobile Suit Gundam: Hathaway (2021) (Quess Paraya)

Video games
 Sengoku Blade: Sengoku Ace Episode II (1996) (Miko / Koyori)
 Harukanaru Toki no Naka de (2000) (Shirin)
 Valkyrie Profile: Covenant of the Plume (2008) (Frei)
 E.X. Troopers (2012) (Seruka)
 Tactics Ogre: Reborn (2022) (Sherri Phoraena)

Dubbing

Live-action
Family Ties (Justine Bateman)
Fraggle Rock (Mokey Fraggle) 
Tucker: The Man and His Dream (Marilyn Lee Tucker (Nina Siemaszko))

Western animation
 An American Tail: Fievel Goes West (Tanya)
 An American Tail: The Treasure of Manhattan Island  (Tanya)
 An American Tail: The Mystery of the Night Monster (Tanya)
 Tom and Jerry (Toodles Galore)

Accolades
Kazue Takahashi Memorial Award at the 17th Seiyu Awards (2023)

References

External links
 Official website 
 
 

1961 births
Living people
Arts Vision voice actors
Japanese video game actresses
Japanese voice actresses
Musicians from Setagaya
Singers from Tokyo
Voice actresses from Setagaya
20th-century Japanese actresses
21st-century Japanese actresses
20th-century Japanese women singers
20th-century Japanese singers
21st-century Japanese women singers
21st-century Japanese singers